Linda M. Field FRES FRSB is a British scientist noted for her work on the insecticide mode of action and resistance.

Biography 
Field was awarded a PhD on the molecular basis of insecticide resistance at Rothamsted Research in 1989. She became leader of the Insect Molecular Biology Group at Rothamsted in 2002, and then Head of the Department of Biological Chemistry in 2010 (now Biointeractions and Crop Protection, BCP).

Since 2005, she has also been a Special Professor at the University of Nottingham. Field is a Fellow of the Royal Society of Biology and a Fellow of the Royal Entomological Society. She was also President of the Royal Entomological Society from 2008–2010.

Education 
Lin Field received a BA (First Class) from the Open University in 1986. She later received a Ph.D entitled "The Molecular Genetic Basis of Insecticide Resistance in the Peach-Potato Aphid, Myzus persicae" in 1989.

Awards 

 Honorary Professor University of Nottingham
 Fellow of the Royal Society of Biology
 Fellow of the Royal Entomological Society
 Honorary Editorial Officer, Royal Entomological Society
 Previous President, Royal Entomological Society
 Member of Editorial Board for Insect Molecular Biology
 Member Science about Science Plant Science Panel

References

Fellows of the Royal Society of Biology
Fellows of the Royal Entomological Society
Presidents of the Royal Entomological Society
Women entomologists
Living people
Year of birth missing (living people)